Georg Brandt (June 26, 1694 – April 29, 1768) was a Swedish chemist and mineralogist who discovered cobalt (c. 1735). He was the first person to discover a metal unknown in ancient times. He is also known for exposing fraudulent alchemists operating during his lifetime.

Biography
Brandt was born in Riddarhyttan, Skinnskatteberg parish, Västmanland to Jurgen Brandt, a mineowner and pharmacist, and Katarina Ysing.  He was professor of chemistry at Uppsala University, and died in Stockholm. He was able to show that cobalt was the source of the blue color in glass, which previously had been attributed to the bismuth found with cobalt.  He died on April 29, 1768, of prostate cancer.

About 1741 he wrote: "As there are six kinds of metals, so I have also shown with reliable experiments...  that there are also six kinds of half-metals: a new half-metal, namely Cobalt regulus in addition to Mercury, Bismuth, Zinc, and the reguluses of Antimony and Arsenic". He gave six ways to distinguish bismuth and cobalt which were typically found in the same ores:

Bismuth fractures while Cobalt is more like a true metal.
The regulus of Shetz fuses with flint and fixed alkali giving a blue glass known as zaffera, sasre, or smalt.  Bismuth does not.
Bismuth melts easily and if kept melted, calcinates forming a yellow powder.
Bismuth amalgamates with Mercury; the regulus of Cobalt does not at all.
Bismuth dissolved in nitric acid and with aqua regia and gives a white precipitate when put in pure water.  The regulus of Cobalt needs alkalies to precipitate, and then forms dark or black precipitates.

Notes

References

External links
Georg Brandt
"Brandt, Georg" by Uno Boklund in:  Charles C. Gillispie, ed., Dictionary of Scientific Biography (New York, New York:  Charles Scribner's Sons, 1970), vol. 2, pages 421-422

1694 births
1768 deaths
People from Skinnskatteberg Municipality
18th-century Swedish chemists
Swedish mineralogists
Members of the Royal Swedish Academy of Sciences
Discoverers of chemical elements